The A3 motorway links Tunis, the capital city of Tunisia, and the city of Bou Salem  away.

The first section, linking Tunis to Medjez el-Bab, opened in July 2005. The whole project, including the section linking Medjez el-Bab to Oued Zarga, 66,3 km long, was inaugurated on February 20, 2006. A 54 kilometer long extension to the city of Bou Salem in the country's northwesternmost governorate Jendouba started in May 2012 and was inaugurated on November 26, 2016.

References

Motorways in Tunisia